is any village or hamlet within a merged town or village in Japan that has experienced depopulation and in danger of disappearing altogether, largely because half of the people living there reach the age of 65 and over.

Such villages are generally found in mountain villages and outlying islands. Villages facing this sort of situation have seen the functions of a community - local government autonomy, maintaining of roads, and ceremonial occasions - rapidly declining, and are facing losing these altogether.

History 
Akira Ōno, a professor of emeritus at Nagano University first proposed the concept in 1991 while teaching humanities at Kōchi University.

A number of surveys have been conducted to explore the phenomenon. In 2005 the Ministry of Agriculture, Forestry and Fisheries commissioned a committee on rural development to do a survey on the true state of genkai shuraku (March 2006). According to the results, there were an estimated 1403 villages that were found to be in danger. These results were based on census results in agricultural villages. In April 2006, the Ministry of Land, Infrastructure, Transport and Tourism commissioned a survey on the state of depopulating areas. The report stated that, of the 62,273 villages that were visited, 775 of them were depopulating.

Terms

References

大野晃 『山村環境社会学序説』 社団法人 農山漁村文化協会、2005年 3月31日、300頁。

See also
Depopulation
Ghost town
Inner city
Hikyō station

Population
Geography of Japan